Centro Insular de Deportes is an indoor arena in Las Palmas, Spain.  It was the home arena of the Spanish ACB League professional basketball team Gran Canaria until 2014. The arena holds 5,200 people.

References

Indoor arenas in Spain
Basketball venues in Spain
CB Gran Canaria
Sports venues in the Canary Islands
Buildings and structures in Las Palmas